Amirvala Madanchi (born 17 July 1994) is an Iranian tennis player.

Madanchi has a career high ATP singles ranking of 1072 achieved on 15 August 2016. He also has a career high ATP doubles ranking of 837 achieved on 29 August 2016.

Madanchi made his ATP main draw debut at the 2017 Dubai Tennis Championships in the doubles draw partnering Omar Alawadhi. He also represents Iran at the Davis Cup, where he has a W/L record of 3–2.

External links

1994 births
Living people
Iranian male tennis players